Scythris patiens is a moth of the family Scythrididae. It was described by Edward Meyrick in 1921. It is found in Zimbabwe.

The wingspan is 15–17 mm. The forewings are light greyish-ochreous and the hindwings are dark grey.

References

Endemic fauna of Zimbabwe
patiens
Moths described in 1921